The Guayanilla River is a river of Guayanilla, Puerto Rico.

USACE project
In mid 2018, the United States Army Corps of Engineers announced it had earmarked $3 million to study and research the river.

See also
 List of rivers of Puerto Rico
 Monte Guilarte

References

External links
 USGS Hydrologic Unit Map – Caribbean Region (1974)
 Rios de Puerto Rico

Rivers of Puerto Rico